Avenida Brasil (Brazil Avenue) is a Brazilian telenovela that aired on Rede Globo from 26 March to 19 October 2012.

Awards and nominations

Notes

References

Avenida Brasil (TV series)
pt:Lista de prêmios e indicações recebidos por Avenida Brasil